Admiral Maitland may refer to:

Anthony Maitland, 10th Earl of Lauderdale (1785–1863), British Royal Navy admiral
John Maitland (Royal Navy officer) (1771–1836), British Royal Navy rear admiral
Thomas Maitland, 11th Earl of Lauderdale (1803–1878), British Royal Navy admiral